The 2007–08 season was the 111th season of competitive football in Scotland.

Overview
 Gretna were competing in the Scottish Premier League for the first time, their first ever season in the top-flight, after being promoted as First Division champions the previous season.
 Dunfermline Athletic competed in the First Division after being relegated from the Scottish Premier League.
 Greenock Morton and Stirling Albion played in the First Division after being promoted as Second Division champions and First Division play-off winners, respectively.
 Ross County were competing in the Second Division after being relegated as the First Division's bottom team and Airdrie United were relegated through the Second Division play-offs.
 Berwick Rangers and Queen's Park were competing in the Second Division after being promoted from the Third Division as champions and Second Division play-offs winners, respectively.
 Forfar Athletic and Stranraer played Third Division football after being relegated as the Second Division's bottom team and Second Division play-off losers, respectively.
 East Stirlingshire had a suspended reduction to associate members hanging over them from the previous season. Finishing bottom of the Third Division would mean an automatic and instant reduction to associate members (and with it a potential expulsion from the league two years later at the end of the 2009–10 season), while finishing 9th or higher would annul any punishment.

Notable events

2007
 1 June – The Scottish Football Association appoint former Rangers and Kilmarnock striker Gordon Smith as the new Chief Executive following the departure of David Taylor who was appointed General Secretary of UEFA.
 20 July – Irn-Bru became the new sponsor of the Scottish Football League, signing a three-year deal.
 11 October – Celtic are fined £25,000 by UEFA for "lack of organisation and improper conduct by supporters" during their UEFA Champions League match with A.C. Milan at Celtic Park.
 17 November – The Scotland national team fail to qualify for Euro 2008 after a 2–1 defeat by Italy at Hampden Park eliminated them at the qualifying stage.
 25 November – St Johnstone beat Dunfermline 3–2 to win the Challenge Cup for the first time.
 29 December – Motherwell captain Phil O'Donnell, 35, collapsed on the pitch at Fir Park during a match against Dundee United, and died later that evening.

2008
 15 March –  East Fife confirm their promotion to the Second Division as Third Division champions with a 3–0 victory over East Stirlingshire, becoming the first team in Britain to win a league trophy in the 2007–08 season.
 16 March – Rangers win the Scottish League Cup by beating Dundee United 3–2 in a penalty shootout after a 2–2 draw in the final at Hampden Park.
 22 March – Scotland's Under-17s qualify for the 2008 UEFA European Under-17 Football Championship after finishing top of their Elite qualifying group.
 29 March – Gretna are relegated from the SPL after losing 2–0 to St Mirren at Love Street.
 29 March – Berwick Rangers are relegated from the Second Division after a 2–2 draw with Peterhead.
 5 April – Ross County win promotion to the First Division as Second Division champions after defeating already-relegated Berwick Rangers 4–0 and second place Airdrie United losing 2–1 to Brechin City.
 8 April – Stirling Albion are relegated from the First Division after a 1–0 defeat to Partick Thistle.
 12 April – First Division Queen of the South beat SPL Aberdeen 4–3 at Hampden Park to qualify for their first Scottish Cup final, in the highest scoring semi-final ever.
 19 April – Hamilton Academical win promotion to the Scottish Premier League as First Division champions following a 2–0 over Clyde.
 10 May – Clyde retain their First Division status after defeating Airdrie United 3–0 on aggregate in the First Division play-off final.
 10 May – Arbroath are promoted to the Second Division after a 2–1 aggregate win over Stranraer in the Second Division play-off final. Cowdenbeath, who were beaten by Arbroath in the semi-finals, are relegated to the Third Division.
 14 May – Rangers lose 2–0 to Zenit St. Petersburg in the UEFA Cup Final.
 22 May – Celtic win their third successive SPL title after defeating Dundee United 1–0.
 24 May – Rangers win the Scottish Cup for the 32nd time after defeating Queen of the South 3–2 in the Final. This was the Dumfries club's first ever Scottish Cup Final appearance in their history.
 29 May – Gretna are demoted to the Third Division after administrator David Elliot could not guarantee the Football League that the club would fulfil its fixtures next season. Consequently, First Division play-off runners-up Airdrie United are promoted to the First Division and Second Division play-off runners-up Stranraer are promoted to the Second Division.

Transfer deals

Managerial changes

League competitions

Scottish Premier League

Celtic won their third consecutive title, having been off the pace for much of the season before a run of seven consecutive victories in the closing stages lifted them to the top of the table. Their title win was dedicated to the memory of assistant manager Tommy Burns, who died from cancer a week before the season ended. Rangers lost out on the title thanks to indifferent form in the final weeks of the campaign, though the fact that they came so close and recorded victories in both domestic cups nonetheless meant the season was a considerable improvement on the two previous seasons, which both ended up trophyless and without a serious challenge for the title. Motherwell finished third and took the UEFA Cup berth, as former player Mark McGhee's return as manager brought a major turnaround in form.

At the other end of the table, Gretna's meteoric rise up the Scottish football pyramid came to a juddering halt; they went bottom of the table following a 4-0 thrashing in their first match, and never left it. The withdrawal of millionaire owner Brooks Mileson plunged them into a financial crisis that forced the club into administration, resulting in them becoming the first top-flight club to earn a ten-point deduction for doing so. This helped cause them to set a new record for the lowest top-flight points total since the adoption of 3 points for a win, and their financial troubles would ultimately prove terminal, resulting in the club folding and being reformed as Gretna F.C. 2008 in the Lowland League for the following year.

Scottish First Division

Hamilton Academical won the title, and with it, their third promotion in seven years, bringing them back into the top-flight for the first time since 1989.

Stirling Albion finished well adrift in bottom place, and suffered automatic relegation as a result. Clyde were sent into the play-offs, and retained their place in the First Division by beating Airdrie United in the final.

Scottish Second Division

Ross County won immediate promotion back to the First Division, vindicating their shock decision to sack manager Dick Campbell early in the campaign with the club top of the table, as rookie manager Derek Adams managed to further improve the club's form, resulting in them comfortably winning the title. Airdrie United initially lost out on promotion after failing to beat Clyde in the play-offs, but Gretna's demise meant Airdrie ended up being promoted anyway.

Berwick Rangers were relegated in bottom place after a dismal campaign, and Cowdenbeath joined them after losing in the play-offs.

Scottish Third Division 

East Fife won the division by a wide margin after their play-off heartbreak the previous season. Arbroath, who had likewise lost out on promotion in the previous season's play-offs, were victorious in this year's campaign. Stranraer, who lost to Arbroath in the play-off final, still ended up earning an immediate return to Division Two, thanks to Gretna's demise.

East Stirlingshire, who had been given a suspended reduction to associate members in the previous campaign (meaning they would have faced an expulsion vote had they finished bottom in both this and the next seasons), managed to avoid this fate by pulling above Forfar Athletic on the final day of the season. It was the first time since 2002 that any other team had finished bottom of the SFL pyramid.

Other honours

Main cup honours

Non-league honours

Senior

Junior
West Region

East Region

North Region

Individual honours

PFA Scotland awards

SFWA awards

Monthly awards

Scottish clubs in Europe

Summary

Celtic

Rangers

Aberdeen

Dunfermline Athletic

National teams

Summary
Scotland failed in their attempt to qualify for the Euro 2008, finishing third in Group B behind 2006 World Cup finalists France and Italy despite beating France twice. Scotland needed a win in their final group game against Italy to qualify, although a draw would have been enough if Ukraine beat France in the last group fixture. Scotland lost 2–1 as a result of a heavily criticised decision by Spanish referee Manuel Mejuto González to award Italy a free kick in stoppage time (resulting in a goal) when it was clear it should have been a free kick to Scotland.

Manager Alex McLeish resigned on 27 November 2007 following the loss against Italy and became manager of Birmingham City, his assistants Roy Aitken and Andy Watson joined him at Birmingham. He was eventually replaced on 24 January 2008 by Southampton manager George Burley, he appointed Steven Pressley and former England captain Terry Butcher as his assistants. In first match in charge a 1–1 draw was achieved against Croatia despite the withdrawal of 7 players.

Results

Youth and Reserve football

Deaths
12 July: Forbes Johnston, 35, Falkirk and Airdrie midfielder.
31 August: Willie Cunningham, 77, St Mirren and Dunfermline defender; Dunfermline, Falkirk and St Mirren manager.
11 September: Ian Porterfield, 61, Aberdeen manager (1986–88).
30 November: Ian Crawford, 73, Hamilton and Hearts winger.
29 December: Phil O'Donnell, 35, Motherwell, Celtic and Scotland midfielder (died whilst playing for Motherwell).
14 January: Johnny Steele, 91, East Fife and Ayr United inside forward.
20 April: Derek McKay, 59, Dundee and Aberdeen winger.
15 May: Tommy Burns, 51, Celtic, Kilmarnock and Scotland midfielder; Kilmarnock and Celtic manager.
7 June: Jimmy Bonthrone, 78, East Fife, Dundee and Stirling Albion inside forward; East Fife and Aberdeen manager.

References

External links
 Scottish Premier League official website
 Scottish Football League official website
 BBC Scottish Premier League portal 
 BBC Scottish Football League portal 

 
Seasons in Scottish football

zh:2007年至2008年蘇格蘭足球超級聯賽